Asaba International Airport (IATA: ABB, ICAO: DNAS): is the primary international airport serving Asaba and the whole of Delta State, Nigeria, and other nearby cities. It is located approximately 7.9 kilometers (4.9  mi) east of the city centre of Asaba.

The airport was conceptualized by the Delta State Government as part of the strategic economic plan to open the sub region to the global business community. The airport was opened to passengers on 13 July 2011.

Asaba airport is gradually emerging as a sub regional hub that connects the key commercial cities of Lagos, Port Harcourt, Abuja, Kano and Onitsha. It also serves other cities within the South-East and South-South region thus facilitating trade and easy connections in the Oil & Gas sector. The Asaba International Airport’s runway is also used by private companies for private flights, charter flights, as well as state visits. The airport is currently being prepared to handle international flight services in the near future.

It is regulated by the Nigeria Civil Aviation Authority and upgraded to Category 6 status in April 2010, Asaba Airport has reopened for commercial and charter airlines. On 23 February 2021, the Delta State Government ceded the management of the airport to Asaba Airport Company by signing a 30 years concession agreement.

History

Project conception and initial construction

Asaba International Airport was first conceptualised in 2007 by the administration of Chief James Onanefe Ibori (1999-2007). The overarching objective was to build a standard passenger and cargo airport infrastructure in Asaba, Delta State, capable of handling codes C, D and E aircraft, to enhance domestic air travel by creating a modern, convenient and attractive transportation option to connect the state to both the national and international community and to serve as an additional source of revenue for the State. The decision to site the airport in Asaba was because of the strategic position of Asaba as the gateway to the South-East and Niger-Delta region. However, the Ibori administration could not embark on the project.

However, the Okowa Administration, in fulfilment of its responsibility to reposition the airport facility, embarked on the rehabilitation of key infrastructures within the airport to resolve the regulator-identified challenges which led to the downgrade. The rehabilitation work, which included the construction of a new runway, setting up an instrument landing system and field lighting to have the airport return to 24-hour operations, was successfully completed and the airport was upgraded to Category 6 by the Nigerian Civil Aviation Authority (NCAA).

Upon completion of the facility upgrade, the Okowa administration commissioned a feasibility study that revealed that it would be about 85% more expensive for the government to operate Asaba International Airport to its full potential and thus a private sector partnership was the desired approach to resuscitate the airport.

Having achieved some quick wins on the Airport repositioning, the Delta State Government under the leadership of His Excellency, Senator Ifeanyi Arthur Okowa decided to expand and modernize the airport facilities under a Private-Public Partnership arrangement, which would aid private sector participation, ensure optimal operations of the Airport, foster economic growth, improve trade and commerce, entrepreneurship, job creation and skills acquisition.

Asaba Airport Concession
Following the upgrade of the airport facility and the government’s intent to invite private sector participation, the Delta State Government issued a Request for Proposal to select a Transaction Adviser and in March 2016, Delta State Executive Council approved the appointment of HALCROW Infrastructure Consortium as the Transaction Adviser to the Government to midwife the concessioning of Asaba International Airport.

On the 23rd of February 2021, Asaba Airport Company signed a 30 years concession agreement with the Delta State Government after a rigorous and transparent selection process.

Key highlights of the concession include:

•	The Concessionaire shall prepare a Master Plan for the Airport setting out the proposed development for the entire Airport, planned over a 20-year time horizon.

•	The Concessionaire shall commence a Mandatory Capital Project Development of the airport which includes: Passenger Terminal Upgrade and Extension, Cargo Terminal, Aviation Fuel Terminal Upgrade, and Business Park.

Upon the signing of the concession agreement, a Project Delivery Oversight Committee (PDOC) consisting of five (5) members including the Concessionaire Representative, two (2) employees of the Concessionaire and two (2) persons appointed by the Delta State Government was established within 30 days of execution of the Agreement. The PDOC is responsible for ensuring that the terms of the concession agreement are duly satisfied and it shall be the single point of contact for the Concessionaire for all matters concerning the agreement. The PDOC was also responsible for overseeing the six months transition period.  The transition period ensured a seamless transfer of the operations and management of the airport to Asaba Airport Company.  The handover of the management of Asaba International Airport to Asaba Airport Company was performed in a symbolic ceremony on 22 August 2021.

Ownership
The Delta State Government is the vested owner of Asaba International Airport and by virtue of the executed concession agreement has conceded the development, operation and management of the airport to Asaba Airport Company Limited for a period of 30 years. The management of the airport covers all airside infrastructure, key airport facilities and all landside infrastructure.

Infrastructure

Runways
Asaba operates as a single-runway airport (11/29) with a length of 3400 meters and a width of 45 meters. Runway 11 is equipped with a Category 1 runway lighting system consisting of approach lights, runway edge lights, runway centerline lights, runway threshold lights and taxiway lights. Precision Approach Path Indicators (PAPI) are installed on both sides of runway 11.

A category 1 Instrument Landing System (ILS) is installed on runway 11 consisting of a Glideslope, Localiser & CVOR co-located with DME. The Take-Off Run Available (TORA) published in the Aeronautical Information Publication (AIP) is 3400m in both directions. Nearly 90% of take-offs and landings are towards the east.

Taxiways and aprons
Asaba International Airport has a network of taxiways connecting the runway to the single apron. All of these taxiways are 25 meters wide. The apron of the airport covers a land space of 45,000 square metres, which means it will accommodate up to ten active Boeing 747s (the second-largest aircraft ever built) at a time.

Terminals
The Airport terminal building has a total area of approximately 3,600 sq. meters and is built to accommodate airlines’ administrative buildings, and departure and arrival lounges. The passenger terminal is located at the northern end of the airport and is split into three areas:
 
Check-in hall:  the check-in hall area has 10 check-in counters and ticket desks for airlines. The offices for the airport operator, agencies and airlines can be accessed from the check-in hall and are located on the 1st, 2nd and 3rd floors.

Arrival hall: The baggage reclaims area has two baggage carousels for baggage delivery and also contains a wine shop, airport clinic and porter services. The desks for various car rental businesses are conveniently located before the exit from the arrival hall.

Departure lounge: After check-in, passengers pass through security screening to the departure waiting area with a seating capacity of 500 passengers. There are four restaurants as well as a clothing and shoe shop, bookstore and travel essentials shop located in the waiting area.

Airlines and destinations

Expansion Proposals
The FIDC-Menzies Consortium is equipped and committed to deploying its skills and expertise toward the transformation of the Asaba International Airport. The proposed development plan for Asaba International Airport will be:

•	The commencement of the modernization programme of the airport through the upgrade of the existing terminal and ancillary facilities, the introduction of optical fibre to provide reliable internet communication, re-organization of the airside terminal and the general elevation of passenger travel experience.

The short-to-medium-term development plan for Asaba International Airport will include:

•	The introduction of international cargo services through the erection of a modern cargo terminal with ancillary facilities.

•	The enhancement of commerce within the airport through the provision of office space, retail and leisure facilities.

•	The development of a hotel and conference facility in partnership with Radisson. The long-term development plan is to transform the Asaba International Airport into an airport city with infrastructure, land use, and economy centering on the airport.

The airside and landside activities in this airport will be resuscitated with attendant benefits on various sectors of the economy of Delta State including but not limited to jobs creation, revenue generation to the State Government and attracting Foreign Direct Investment into Delta State. This project is also envisaged to be rewarding to all stakeholders as they have pledged to remain resolute in their ability and capacity, based on the composition of the Consortium and their track records, to reposition the airport to be amongst the best in West Africa and a benchmark for international airports operations in the country.

Accidents and incidents
There has been no report of accidents and incidents at the Asaba International Airport since operations commenced.

See also
Transport in Nigeria
List of airports in Nigeria

References

External links

Delta Govt hands over Asaba Airport to concessionaire
OurAirports - Asaba
OpenStreetMap - Asaba
Asaba Airport

Airports in Nigeria
Delta State